Dezab (also Romanized as Dezāb) is a city in the Central District of Dezful County, Khuzestan Province, Iran.  At the 2006 census, its population was 10,169, in 2,279 families.

References

Populated places in Dezful County

Cities in Khuzestan Province